Geoffrey Franceys Cranswick (10 April 189419 July 1978) was the Anglican Bishop of Tasmania from 1944 to 1963.

Cranswick was educated at The King's School, Parramatta, Sydney Church of England Grammar School and the University of Sydney. He was made deacon at Michaelmas 1920 (3 October) and ordained priest the Michaelmas following (2 October 1921) — both times by John Watts Ditchfield, Bishop of Chelmsford, at Chelmsford Cathedral — to a curacy at West Ham before being with the Church Mission Society (CMS) in Bengal to 1937 and then Principal of King Edward's School Chapra until his ordination to the episcopate to serve as Bishop of Tasmania. He was consecrated a bishop on the Feast of the Conversion of Paul the Apostle 1944 (25 January) at Westminster Abbey by William Temple, Archbishop of Canterbury. He died on 19 July 1978 and is  buried in the churchyard at St Matthew New Norfolk.  His elder brother, George, was the Bishop of Gippsland from 1917 to 1942.

References

1894 births
Clergy from Sydney
People educated at The King's School, Parramatta
People educated at Sydney Church of England Grammar School
University of Sydney alumni
Anglican bishops of Tasmania
1978 deaths
20th-century Anglican bishops in Australia